Canon City is a 1948 American film noir crime film written and directed by Crane Wilbur.  The drama features Scott Brady, Jeff Corey, and Whit Bissell, along with prison warden Roy Best playing himself. The film takes its name from Canon City, Colorado.

Plot
This account of a violent prison break is a semi-documentary that opens with a newsreel-type tour of the prison. Led by Carl Schwartzmiller (Jeff Corey), 12 convicts plan their escape but prisoner Jim Sherbondy (Scott Brady) is reluctant to go along with the group.

Cast
 Scott Brady as Sherbondy
 Jeff Corey as Schwartzmiller
 Whit Bissell as Heilman
 Stanley Clements as New
 Charles Russell as Tolley
 DeForest Kelley as Smalley
 Ralph Byrd as Officer Gray
 Mabel Paige as Mrs. Oliver
 Roy Best as himself (as Warden Roy Best)

Background
The film is based on a prison break that occurred at the Colorado Territorial Correctional Facility at Canon City, Colorado, on 30 December 1947. Within a week, all escapees were killed or captured.

Production
The film was shot almost entirely on location at the site of the Canon City state penitentiary in March 1948. It was originally budgeted at $350,000.

Reception

Critical response
The New York Times film critic Bosley Crowther wrote, "Another convincing demonstration that crime, while it may not 'pay,' can be turned to profitable uses by the makers of action films is given by Canon City, a tough semi-documentary job about a prison break in Colorado ... Crane Wilbur has held to a realistic line for much of the prison action and in some of the outside episodes. His actors—especially Jeff Corey, who plays the leader of the 'break'—are generally tough, convincing fellows with nothing to recommend in charm. And the movement is swift and dynamic, not unlikely in such affairs."

Critic Dennis Schwartz said of the film, "An unspectacular true story (it's dated) about a prison break that is told in a semi-documentary style. Its saving grace is that it is well presented ...This minor work has some resemblance to film noir through the characterization of Sherbondy as someone who is not a hardened criminal, but got into trouble both on the outside and then inside of prison because he made the wrong friends."

Notes

References

External links
 
 
 
 

1948 films
1948 crime drama films
American crime drama films
American black-and-white films
Film noir
American prison drama films
American films based on actual events
Films set in Colorado
Eagle-Lion Films films
1940s prison films
1940s English-language films
1940s American films